The lithium iron phosphate battery ( battery) or LFP battery (lithium ferrophosphate) is a type of lithium-ion battery using  lithium iron phosphate as the cathode material, and a graphitic carbon electrode with a metallic backing as the anode. 
Because of their lower cost, high safety, low toxicity, long cycle life and other factors, LFP batteries are finding a number of roles in vehicle use, utility-scale stationary applications, and backup power. LFP batteries are cobalt-free. As of September 2022, LFP type battery market share for EV's reached 31%, and of that, 68% was from Tesla and Chinese EV maker BYD production alone. Chinese manufacturers currently hold a near monopoly of LFP battery type production. With patents having started to expire in 2022 and the increased demand for cheaper EV batteries, LFP type production is expected to rise further to surpass lithium nickel manganese cobalt oxides (NMC) type batteries in 2028.

The energy density of an LFP battery is lower than that of other common lithium ion battery types such as nickel manganese cobalt (NMC) and nickel cobalt aluminum (NCA), and also has a lower operating voltage; CATL's LFP batteries are currently at 125 watt hours (Wh) per kg, up to possibly 160 Wh/kg with improved packing technology, while BYD's LFP batteries are at 150 Wh/kg, compared to over 300 Wh/kg for the highest NMC batteries. Notably, the energy density of Panasonic’s “2170” NCA batteries used in 2020 in Tesla’s Model 3 is around 260 Wh/kg, which is 70% of its "pure chemicals" value.

History

 is a natural mineral of the olivine family (triphylite). Arumugam Manthiram and John B. Goodenough first identified the polyanion class of cathode materials for lithium ion batteries.  was then identified as a cathode material belonging to the polyanion class for use in batteries in 1996 by Padhi et al. Because of its low cost, non-toxicity, the natural abundance of iron, its excellent thermal stability, safety characteristics, electrochemical performance, and specific capacity (170 mA·h/g, or 610 C/g) it has gained considerable market acceptance.

The chief barrier to commercialization was its intrinsically low electrical conductivity. This problem was overcome by reducing the particle size, coating the  particles with conductive materials such as carbon nanotubes, or both. This approach was developed by Michel Armand and his coworkers. Another approach by Yet Ming Chiang's group consisted of doping LFP with cations of materials such as aluminium, niobium, and zirconium.

Negative electrodes (anode, on discharge) made of petroleum coke were used in early lithium-ion batteries; later types used natural or synthetic graphite.

Specifications

 Cell voltage
 Minimum discharge voltage = 2.0-2.8 V
 Working voltage = 
 Maximum charge voltage = 3.60-3.65 V
 Volumetric energy density = 220 Wh/L (790 kJ/L)
 Gravimetric energy density > 90 Wh/kg (> 320 J/g). Up to 160 Wh/kg (580 J/g).
 Cycle life from 2,700 to more than 10,000 cycles depending on conditions.

Comparison with other battery types 

The LFP battery uses a lithium-ion-derived chemistry and shares many advantages and disadvantages with other lithium-ion battery chemistries. However, there are significant differences.

Resource availability
Iron and phosphates are very common in the Earth's crust. LFP contain neither nickel nor cobalt, both of which are supply-constrained and expensive. As with lithium, human rights and environmental concerns have been raised concerning the use of cobalt. Environmental concerns have also been raised regarding the extraction of nickel.

Cost
In 2020, the lowest reported LFP cell prices were $80/kWh (12.5Wh/$) .

A 2020 report published by the Department of Energy compared the costs of large scale energy storage systems built with LFP vs NMC.  It found that the cost per kWh of LFP batteries was about 6% less than NMC, and it projected that the LFP cells would last about 67% longer (more cycles). Because of differences between the cell's characteristics, the cost of some other components of the storage system would be somewhat higher for LFP, but in balance it still remains less costly per kWh than NMC.

Better ageing and cycle-life characteristics
LFP chemistry offers a considerably longer cycle life than other lithium-ion chemistries. Under most conditions it supports more than 3,000 cycles, and under optimal conditions it supports more than 10,000 cycles. NMC batteries support about 1,000 to 2,300 cycles, depending on conditions.

LFP cells experience a slower rate of capacity loss (a.k.a. greater calendar-life) than lithium-ion battery chemistries such as cobalt or manganese spinel lithium-ion polymer batteries (LiPo battery) or lithium-ion batteries.

Viable alternative to lead-acid batteries
Because of the nominal 3.2 V output, four cells can be placed in series for a nominal voltage of 12.8 V. This comes close to the nominal voltage of six-cell lead-acid batteries. Along with the good safety characteristics of LFP batteries, this makes LFP a good potential replacement for lead-acid batteries in applications such as automotive and solar applications, provided the charging systems are adapted not to damage the LFP cells through excessive charging voltages (beyond 3.6 volts DC per cell while under charge), temperature-based voltage compensation, equalisation attempts or continuous trickle charging. The LFP cells must be at least balanced initially before the pack is assembled and a protection system also needs to be implemented to ensure no cell can be discharged below a voltage of 2.5 V or severe damage will occur in most instances, due to irreversible deintercalation of LiFePO4 into FePO4.

Safety
The P–O bond in the  ion is stronger than the Co–O bond in the  ion, so that when abused (short-circuited, overheated, etc.), the oxygen atoms are released more slowly. This stabilization of the redox energies also promotes faster ion migration.

As lithium migrates out of the cathode in a  cell, the  undergoes non-linear expansion that affects the structural integrity of the cell.

No lithium remains in the cathode of a fully charged LFP cell. In a  cell, approximately 50% remains.  is highly resilient during oxygen loss, which typically results in an exothermic reaction in other lithium cells. As a result,  cells are harder to ignite in the event of mishandling (especially during charge). The  battery does not decompose at high temperatures.

Lower energy density
The energy density (energy/volume) of a new LFP battery is some 14% lower than that of a new  battery.   Since discharge rate is a percentage of battery capacity, a higher rate can be achieved by using a larger battery (more ampere hours) if low-current batteries must be used. Better yet, a high-current LFP cell (which will have a higher discharge rate than a lead acid or  battery of the same capacity) can be used.

Uses

Home energy storage 
Enphase pioneered LFP home storage batteries for reasons of cost and fire safety, although the market remains split among competing chemistries. Though lower energy density compared to other lithium chemistries adds mass and volume, both may be more tolerable in a static application. In 2021, there were several suppliers to the home end user market, including SonnenBatterie and Enphase. Tesla Motors continues to use NMC batteries in its home energy storage products, but in 2021 switched to LFP for its utility-scale battery product. According to EnergySage the most frequently quoted home energy storage battery brand in the U.S. is Enphase, which in 2021 surpassed Tesla Motors and LG.

Vehicles 
Higher discharge rates needed for acceleration, lower weight and longer life makes this battery type ideal for forklifts, bicycles and electric cars. 12V LiFePO4 batteries are also gaining popularity as a second (house) battery for a caravan, motor-home or boat.

Tesla Motors uses LFP batteries in all standard-range Models 3 and Y made since October 2021.

As of September 2022, LFP batteries had increased its market share of the entire EV battery market to 31%. Of those, 68% were deployed by two companies, Tesla and BYD.

Lithium iron phosphate batteries officially surpassed ternary batteries in 2021 with 52% of installed capacity. Analysts estimate that its market share will exceed 60% in 2024.

In February 2023, Ford announced that it will be investing $3.5 billion to build a factory in Michigan that will produce low-cost batteries for some of its electric vehicles. The project will be fully-owned by a Ford subsidiary, but will use technology licensed from Chinese battery company Contemporary Amperex Technology Co., Limited (CATL).

Solar-powered lighting systems
Single "14500" (AA battery–sized) LFP cells are now used in some solar-powered landscape lighting instead of 1.2 V NiCd/NiMH.

LFP's higher (3.2 V) working voltage lets a single cell drive an LED without circuitry to step up the voltage. Its increased tolerance to modest overcharging (compared to other Li cell types) means that  can be connected to photovoltaic cells without circuitry to halt the recharge cycle. The ability to drive an LED from a single LFP cell also obviates battery holders, and thus the corrosion, condensation and dirt issues associated with products using multiple removable rechargeable batteries.

By 2013, better solar-charged passive infrared security lamps emerged. As AA-sized LFP cells have a capacity of only 600 mAh (while the lamp's bright LED may draw 60 mA), the units shine for at most 10 hours.  However, if triggering is only occasional, such units may be satisfactory even charging in low sunlight, as lamp electronics ensure after-dark "idle" currents of under 1 mA.

Other uses
Some electronic cigarettes use these types of batteries. Other applications include marine electrical systems and propulsion, flashlights, radio-controlled models, portable motor-driven equipment, amateur radio equipment, industrial sensor systems and emergency lighting.
 
A recent modification discussed here  is to replace the potentially unstable separator with a more stable material. Recent discoveries found that LiFePO4 and to an extent Li-ion can degrade due to heat, when test cells were taken apart a brick red compound had formed that when analyzed suggesting that molecular breakdown of the previously believed stable separator was a common failure mode. In this case, the side reactions gradually consume Li ions trapping them in stable compounds so they can't be shuttled.
Also three electrode batteries that permit external devices to detect internal shorts forming are a potential near term solution to the dendrite issue.

See also 

 List of battery types
 List of battery sizes
 List of electric-vehicle-battery manufacturers
 Comparison of commercial battery types
 Lithium-titanate battery
 Lithium–air battery
 Lithium polymer battery
 Nanowire battery
 Phosphate
 Power-to-weight ratio
 Solid-state battery
 Super-iron battery
 Blade battery

References

Lithium-ion batteries
Phosphates
Vanadium

ja:リチウムイオン二次電池#リン酸鉄リチウムイオン電池